Eunoe clarki is a scale worm described from Point Barrow, Alaska.

Description
Number of segments 41; elytra 15 pairs. Middorsally transversely banded greyish green. Anterior margin of prostomium with an acute anterior projection. Lateral antennae inserted ventrally (beneath prostomium and median antenna). Notochaetae about as thick as neurochaetae. Bidentate neurochaetae absent.

References

Phyllodocida
Animals described in 1954